The Perlidae are a family of stoneflies, with more than 50 genera and 1,100 described species. The majority of the Perlidae are found in eastern North America, but they occur worldwide except for Antarctica and parts of Africa. Their lifecycles range between one and three years. They adults emerge in the summer; they are very active and known to be attracted to light sources. They are usually very sensitive to changes in environment.

Perlidae are usually lotic and lentic erosional. They are found in cool, clear medium-sized to large streams and sometimes in larger, warm rivers that carry silt. They are crawlers and can move quickly. In still water, no water moves over their gills, so they move their bodies up and down to keep oxygen flowing over them.

They are engulfer-predators. They consume all types of invertebrates. Very young larvae are collector-gatherers.

Genera
These 56 genera belong to the family Perlidae:

 Acroneuria Pictet, 1841
 Agnetina Klapálek, 1907
 Anacroneuria Klapálek, 1909
 Attaneuria Ricker, 1954
 Beloneuria Needham & Claassen, 1925
 Brahmana Klapálek, 1914
 Calineuria Ricker, 1954
 Caroperla Kohno, 1946
 CHINOPERLa Zwick, 1980
 Claassenia Wu, 1934
 Dinocras Klapálek, 1907
 Doroneuria Needham & Claassen, 1925
 Eccoptura Klapálek, 1921
 Enderleina Jewett, 1960
 Eoperla Illies, 1956
 Etrocorema Klapálek, 1909
 Flavoperla Chu, 1929
 Furcaperla Sivec, 1988
 Gibosia Okamoto, 1912
 Hansonoperla Nelson, 1979
 Helenoperla Sivec, 1997
 Hemacroneuria Enderlein, 1909
 Hesperoperla Banks, 1938
 Inconeuria Klapálek, 1916
 Kamimuria Klapálek, 1907
 Kempnyella Illies, 1964
 Kempnyia Klapálek, 1914
 Kiotina Klapálek, 1907
 Klapalekia Claassen, 1936
 Macrogynoplax Enderlein, 1909
 Marthamea Klapálek, 1907
 Mesoperla Klapálek, 1913
 Miniperla Kawai, 1967
 Neoperla Needham, 1905
 Neoperlops Banks, 1939
 Nigroperla Illies, 1964
 Niponiella Klapálek, 1907
 Nishineuria Uchida, 1990
 Onychoplax Klapálek, 1914
 Oyamia Klapálek, 1907
 Paragnetina Klapálek, 1907
 Perla Geoffroy, 1762
 Perlesta Banks, 1906
 Perlinella Banks, 1900
 Phanoperla Banks, 1938
 Pictetoperla Illies, 1964
 Sinacroneuria Yang & Yang, 1995
 Tetropina Klapálek, 1909
 Togoperla Klapálek, 1907
 Tyloperla Sivec & Stark, 1988
 Xanthoneuria Uchida, Stark & Sivec, 2011
 † Archaeoperla Liu, Ren & Sinitshenkova, 2008
 † Dominiperla Stark & Lentz, 1992
 † Electroneuria Sroka, Staniczek & Kondratieff, 2018
 † Largusoperla Chen, Wang & Du, 2018
 † Pinguisoperla Chen, 2018

References

 
Plecoptera families